László Sillai (2 June 1943 – 15 June 2007) was a Hungarian wrestler. He competed in the men's Greco-Roman 87 kg at the 1968 Summer Olympics.

References

External links
 

1943 births
2007 deaths
Hungarian male sport wrestlers
Olympic wrestlers of Hungary
Wrestlers at the 1968 Summer Olympics
Sportspeople from Győr-Moson-Sopron County
World Wrestling Champions